The Men's 5 km Open Water event at the 2001 World Aquatics Championships was held on July 16, 2001 in Fukuoka.

Results

Key: DQ = Disqualified

References

FINA FINA
5km results from Fukuoka

World Aquatics Championships
Open water swimming at the 2001 World Aquatics Championships